The Political Prisoner's Cross 1940–1945 was a Belgian war medal established by royal decree of the Regent on 13 November 1947 and awarded to Belgian citizens arrested and interned by the Germans as political prisoners during the Second World War.  The award's statute included provisions for posthumous award should the intended recipient not survive detention, and the right of the widow, the mother or the father of the deceased to wear the cross.

Award description
The Political Prisoner's Cross 1940–1945 was a 37mm wide silver cross pattée.  Its obverse bore a 2 cm in diameter central medallion surrounded by barbed wire with an inverted red enamelled triangle with a black capital "B" at its center.  The triangle with the "B" represents the insignia internees had to wear on their prisoners' uniforms identifying them as Belgian political prisoners.  The reverse also bore a central medallion, this one though was enamelled in black bearing the years "1940 1945" in silver numerals on two rows.

The cross was suspended by a ring through a suspension loop to a 38mm wide white silk moiré ribbon with six 3mm wide longitudinal blue stripes 3mm apart from each other.  These colours represented the striped prisoners' uniforms.

Silver bars with up to four small, five or six pointed stars on them could be worn on the ribbon, each star denoting a period of six months of internment.  Many veterans though opted for small individual silver stars directly affixed to the ribbon.  In the case of a posthumous award, a black enamelled bar was worn on the ribbon above the others.

Notable recipients (partial list)
 Captain Charles de Hepcée
 Doctor Ivan Colmant
 Paul Coart
 Baron Paul of Halter
 Sir René Bauduin
 Walter Ganshof van der Meersch
 Fernand Hanssens
 Lucien Wercollier
 Josephine Van Durme
Major General Paul Jacques
Police Lieutenant General Oscar-Eugène Dethise
Alfons Vranckx
Viscount Omer Vanaudenhove
Baron Gilbert Thibaut de Maisières
Count Jean d’Ursel
Count Georges Moens de Fernig
 François Ernest Samray, awarded with 7 stars

See also

 List of Orders, Decorations and Medals of the Kingdom of Belgium

References

Other sources
 Quinot H., 1950, Recueil illustré des décorations belges et congolaises, 4e Edition. (Hasselt)
 Cornet R., 1982, Recueil des dispositions légales et réglementaires régissant les ordres nationaux belges. 2e Ed. N.pl.,  (Brussels)
 Borné A.C., 1985, Distinctions honorifiques de la Belgique, 1830–1985 (Brussels)

External links
Bibliothèque royale de Belgique (In French)
Les Ordres Nationaux Belges (In French)
ARS MORIENDI Notables from Belgian history (In French and Dutch)

Orders, decorations, and medals of Belgium
Awards established in 1947
1947 establishments in Belgium
The Holocaust in Belgium
Military awards and decorations of World War II
Political imprisonment in Germany